The 1992 Tirreno–Adriatico was the 27th edition of the Tirreno–Adriatico cycle race and was held from 11 March to 18 March 1992. The race started in Lido di Ostia and finished in San Benedetto del Tronto. The race was won by Rolf Sørensen of the Ariostea team.

General classification

References

1992
1992 in Italian sport
Tirreno–Adriatico